National Route 225 is a national highway of Japan connecting Makurazaki, Kagoshima and Kagoshima, Kagoshima in Japan, with a total length of 53.1 km (32.99 mi).

References

National highways in Japan
Roads in Kagoshima Prefecture